"Puzzle"/"Revive" is Mai Kuraki's thirty-first single, released as a double A-side on April 1, 2009.  "Puzzle" was used for the thirteenth Detective Conan film Detective Conan: The Raven Chaser, and "Revive" was used as the twenty-fifth opening theme for the Detective Conan TV series.

On February 24, Kuraki's official website announced the single had been pushed ahead two weeks due to overwhelming fan demand. "Puzzle/Revive" debuted at number 3 on the Oricon single chart, making it her first single to enter the Top 3 in nearly five years, since 2004's "Ashita e Kakeru Hashi".

Usage in media
 "Puzzle" - "Detective Conan: The Raven Chaser" ending theme song
 "Revive" - "Detective Conan" twenty-fifth opening theme

Track listing

Personnel

"Revive"
 Vocals: Mai Kuraki
 Music written by Aika Ohno
 Arranged by Miguel Sa Pessoa
 Guitars: Yuji Hamasaki
 Bass: Baron Browne
 Computer Manipulations: Perry Geyer
 Keyboards: Miguel Sa Pessoa
 Chorus: Mai Kuraki

Charts

Oricon Sales Chart

Billboard Japan Sales Chart

References

External links
Kuraki Mai Official Website

2009 singles
2009 songs
Mai Kuraki songs
Case Closed songs
Japanese film songs
Songs written for animated films
Song recordings produced by Daiko Nagato